From Here to Now to You is the sixth studio album by singer-songwriter Jack Johnson. The album was released on September 17, 2013. The album's first single "I Got You" was released on June 10, 2013.

Commercial performance
The album debuted at number one on the Billboard 200 chart, with first-week sales of 117,000 copies in the United States.  The album also debuted at number one on the Canadian Albums chart and on the US Billboard Digital Albums chart, Top Rock Albums chart, Alternative Albums chart and Folk Albums chart.

Track listing

Charts

Weekly charts

Year-end charts

Certifications

Personnel
Jack Johnson – vocals, guitar, ukulele, dobro, percussion
Adam Topol – drums, percussion
Merlo Podlewski – bass, piano, vibes, guitar
Zach Gill – piano, wurlitzer, vibes, glockenspiel, accordion, melodica, vocals, bass kalimba
Ben Harper – vocals, weissenborn slide guitar on "Change"

References

2013 albums
Jack Johnson (musician) albums
Republic Records albums
Brushfire Records albums
Albums produced by Mario Caldato Jr.